West Feliciana Parish Public Schools (WFPPS) or West Feliciana Parish School Board (WFPSB) is a school district headquartered in St. Francisville, Louisiana, United States.

The district serves residents of West Feliciana Parish, including St. Francisville, Bains, Tunica, Wakefield, and the residences of the Louisiana State Penitentiary (Angola).

As of 2012 it was the school district in Louisiana with the third-highest level of academic performance, after the Zachary Community School Board and the New Orleans Public Schools campuses not within the Recovery School District.

School uniforms
All WFPPS schools have mandatory school uniforms.

Schools
All of the schools are located in unincorporated areas.

Secondary schools
 West Feliciana High School  (Bains)
 West Feliciana Middle (Bains)
The newest school, WFMS opened in 1999. Upon opening it was accredited by the Southern Association of Colleges and Schools.

Primary schools
 2nd Grade-5th Grade: Bains Elementary School (Bains)
The school is adjacent to Bains Lower Elementary.
 Preschool-1st Grade: Bains Lower Elementary School (Bains)

Former schools

 Preschool-5th Grade: Tunica Elementary School (Tunica)
 The Tunica Elementary building is in proximity to the Louisiana State Penitentiary (LSP), being  from the facility. During its life about 125 students attended the school. Before its closure, it had 110 students. Many Tunica Elementary students lived on the premises of LSP. On May 18, 2011, due to budget cuts, the parish school board voted to close Tunica Elementary.

References

External links

 West Feliciana Parish Public Schools

Education in West Feliciana Parish, Louisiana
School districts in Louisiana